RW2 may refer to:

 .rw2, a raw image format used in Panasonic cameras
 RagWing RW2 Special I, a family of biplane, single engine homebuilt aircraft